Silay, officially the City of Silay, is a 3rd class component city in the province of Negros Occidental, Philippines. According to the 2020 census, it has a population of 130,478 people.

It is part of the metropolitan area called Metro Bacolod, which includes the cities of Bacolod (the metropolitan center) and Talisay. It has a sizable commercial and fishing port and is the site of the new Bacolod–Silay International Airport, which replaced the old Bacolod City Domestic Airport.

Silay is often referred to as the "Paris of Negros" due to its artists, cultural shows and large collection of perfectly preserved heritage houses. More than thirty of these houses have been declared by the National Historical Commission of the Philippines as part of the Silay National Historical Landmark. In 2015, the city celebrated its 58th charter anniversary.

Etymology
The appellation Silay is derived from the name of a native tree which grew abundantly in the area. The kansilay is the city's official tree.

The Legend of Princess Kansilay
A local legend tells of how Silay City got its name. It is said that in the days of the datus and rajahs, there once lived a princess named Kansilay. An attack on the settlement by pirates was thwarted when the princess bravely led the people in the village's defense. The fight was furious and the princess fought like a seasoned warrior. Murals that used to grace some of the city's public buildings depict her as a fierce fighter wielding a huge talibong, a short native single-edged sword. The pirates were routed, but at the cost of the princess' life. Her paramour arrived in time to see her die. In grief, the people lovingly buried her. To their surprise, a tree grew right over her grave, the first Kansilay tree, a final gift from the brave princess.

History

Spanish colonization 
Silay was first settled in 1565, under the name "Carobcob", which means "to scratch" in Kinaray-a; residents of the settlement relied upon harvesting tuway clams, which involved "scratching" (or raking) the sands for the mollusks at low tide, as a means of livelihood. In early writings, the settlement was also referred to as "Calubcub", "Caracol" and "Caraco". The last two variations mean "snail" or a "spiral" in Spanish. Carobcob was built near the mouth of a creek; nothing is left of the village today. Carobcob was granted as an encomienda to Cristobal Nuñez Paroja, one of the seventeen soldiers of Miguel López de Legazpi on January 25, 1571.

In the second half of the century, Moro slave raiders escalated their incursions on the large island, forcing the Corregidor of Negros to adopt the policy of flight rather than resistance. People left their homes sometime in 1760 and settled in a new location between two small rivers, Matagoy and Panaogao. A paloisades or estacada (Spanish for "palisade" or "stockade") was constructed to protect the populace from Moro raiders. The place is now known as Sitio Estaca, its name derived from the Spanish word estacada.

In 1760, Silay was recognized as a town being referred to in a letter from Governor Juan Jose de Mijares (1772–1775) mentioning Silay as a leading town in the north. In 1776, the bishop of Cebu considered Silay as the center of the parish.  In 1760, it became a pueblo or town. By 1896, it had become a leading sugar-producing area because of the Horno Economico (sugar mill) built in 1846 by a Frenchman who became a permanent resident of Silay, Yves Leopold Germain Gaston.

Negros Revolution 

With the outbreak of the Revolution of 1896 came a division between the sugarcane planters of Silay and the clergy. Some planters and clergy supported the rebels while others were against the revolution. On November 5, 1898, at about 2:00 in the afternoon, residents of Silay gathered in the street corner now known as Cinco de Noviembre Street and from there they proceeded to the Spanish garrison near the Catholic Church. The encounter was bloodless. The Spanish civil guard commander, Lt. Maximiano Correa, refused to surrender. After negotiations with the revolutionaries mediated by Juan Viaplana, a local Spaniard, the Spanish garrison did surrender. A Philippine flag was raised for the first time at the Silay plaza later that afternoon. Leandro Locsin became temporary president after the signing of the terms of surrender. Timoteo Unson and the group of Silay residents then marched south to join forces with some residents of Talisay for an attack on Bacolod, the capital.

World War II 
On the slopes of Mt. Silay lies Patag, the site of Imperial Japan's last stand in Negros during World War II. In 1945, U.S. military forces landed in the island. The occupying forces of the Nagano Detachment of the Imperial Japanese Army retreated to Silay and proceeded up Mt. Silay to Patag. There, they established a defensive position. Military forces of the Philippine Commonwealth and soldiers of the U.S. 40th Infantry Division proceeded up the slopes of Mt. Silay with help from Filipino soldiers of the 7th, 72nd and 75th Infantry Division of the Philippine Commonwealth Army and Negrense guerrilla fighters and defeated the Japanese defenders. Today, the site is marked by a monument dedicated to the efforts which led to the liberation of the island of Negros.

Post-World War II

Cityhood 

On June 12, 1957, Silay was converted into a city, by virtue of Republic Act 1621.

Culture

Silay City had been known in the past as the "Paris of Negros" and the "cultural and intellectual hub of Negros" due to the residents' love for knowledge and works of art, and its collection of heritage mansions built during the height of the Philippine sugar industry's success, of which Negros was the very center. Most notable among these houses is Balay Negrense, the mansion of the son of the first Negrense sugar baron, Yves Leopold Germain Gaston and the Hofileña Ancestral House built by Manuel Severino Hofileña for his wife, former Miss Silay Gilda Ledesma Hojilla.

Silay became a chartered city on June 12, 1957, by virtue of Republic Act 1621.

On June 7, 2003, Silay City became the first local government unit in the Republic of the Philippines to hold a referendum through a People's Initiative approving the 2003 annual executive budget.

Today, Silay City is listed by the Department of Tourism as one of its 25 tourist destinations in the Philippines. It is considered the seat of arts, culture and ecotourism in the Negros Island Region.

Hugyaw Kansilay Festival 
Every 12th day of June, the city celebrates their annual festival called Hugyaw Kansilay Festival. The theme is derived from the story of Kansilay, which is also the origin of the city's name. The festival reflects the growth of Silay; from a lowly pueblo to a city that can hold its own among the country's best. The city's festival dance depicts the setting, characters, plot, sub-plots, conflict, climax and the story of the Legend of Kansilay.

Geography

Barangays
Silay is politically subdivided into 16 barangays.

Climate

Demographics

Economy

Transportation

Airports

The Bacolod–Silay International Airport, serves the whole Metro Bacolod area and surrounding places. The P4.37-billion airport is capable of handling all-weather and night-landing operations. Its 2,000-meter (6,600 ft.) long and 45-meter (148 ft.) wide primary runway, and 678-meter by 23-meter taxiways can accommodate Airbus A320 family-size aircraft, and the Boeing 737, while the apron can hold five aircraft at any one time. The runway runs in a direction of 03°/21°. Provisions for a  expansion of the present runway in order to accommodate even larger airplanes like the Airbus A330, Airbus A340 and Boeing 747 are now in place. The airport is expected to be the primary entrance by air to Negros Island Region.

Silay is 50 minutes by air from Manila, 30 minutes by air from Cebu, 1 hour by air from Cagayan de Oro and 37.2 minutes by air from General Santos. Commercial airlines operating in the Bacolod–Silay International Airport are Philippine Airlines, Cebu Pacific Air, PAL Express, Zest Airways and South East Asian Airlines.

Education
In Silay City, there are 31 schools that are officially listed by the city's Department of Education.

Public schools

Elementary 
 Silay South Elementary School
 Silay North Elementary School
 Governor Emilio Gaston Memorial Elementary School
 Barangay Mambulac Elementary School
 Guinhalaran Integrated School
 Balaring Elementary School
 Don Estaquio Hofileña Memorial School
 Villa Miranda Elementary School
 Estaquio Lopez Elementary School
 Don Homero Hilado Tanpinco Elementary School
 Patag Elementary School
 Silay SPED Center (Elementary)
 Salvacion Elementary School
 Emiliano Lizares Elementary School
 Hinicayan Elementary School
 Hawaiian-Philippine Company Elementary School
 Santo Rosario Elementary School
 La Purisima Concepcion Elementary School

High schools 
 Doña Montserrat Lopez Memorial High School
 Barangay E Lopez National High School
 Barangay Guimbalaon National High School
 Don Felix T. Lacson Memorial National High School
 Doña Montserrat Lopez Memorial High School HPCO Extension
 Doña Montserrat Lopez Memorial High School Patag Extension
 Doña Montserrat Lopez Memorial High School Santo Rosario Extension
 Don Albino and Doña Dolores Jison Integrated School
 Lantawan Integrated School
 Don Serafin L. Golez Memorial Integrated School
 Napilas Integrated School
 Sibato Integrated School
 Violeta Integrated School
 Silay SPED Center
 Guinhalaran Integrated School

Private schools 
 St. Theresita's Academy
 Silay Institute
 Cinco De Noviembre Learning Center
 Faith Christian Academy-Silay Incorporated
 St. Francis of Assisi of Silay Foundation Inc.
 San Diego Study Center
 Silay Hope Baptist Academy

Gallery

Sister cities
Silay City has been twinned with the following cities:

Local
  Mandaluyong, Metro Manila

International
 Marseille of Provence-Alpes-Côte d'Azur, France
 Amagi of Kagoshima Prefecture, Japan

Notable residents
Juan Sebastián Elcano
Yves Leopold Germain Gaston
Leandro Locsin
Jose Locsin
Teodoro Locsin Jr.
Rose Lacson-Porteous
Sander Severino

See also
Silay (volcano)
Tagasilay
Metro Bacolod

References

External links

 [ Philippine Standard Geographic Code]
Official Website of the City of Silay
2007 Philippine Census Information Region VI – Western Visayas
Local Governance Performance Management System

 
Cities in Negros Occidental
Metro Bacolod
Populated places established in 1760
1760 establishments in the Philippines
Component cities in the Philippines